Charles Joseph Sacleux (1856–1943) was a French Catholic missionary and linguist. He is known also as a botanist, having collected a herbarium of over 2000 plants in East Africa and Zanzibar.

Life
He was born on 5 July 1856 at Enquin in northern France, the son of Auguste Sacleux who died when he was aged 5, and his wife Marie Firmine Bayart. He joined the Holy Ghost Fathers in 1875, after two years of seminary, and became a priest in 1878.

Sacleux went to Zanzibar in 1879, and was posted to Bagamoyo. In 1878 he returned to France, and took a position at Chevilly. He died at Grasse on 16 May 1943.

In 1890, botanist Baill. published 
Sacleuxia, a genus of flowering plants from Kenya and Tanzania, in the family Apocynaceae and named in Charles Sacleux's honor.

Works
Sacleux wrote:

Essai de phonétique avec son application à l'étude des idiomes''' (1905)Grammaire des dialectes swahilis (1909)Dictionnaire swahili-français'' (1939). Online version (open access)

His dictionary of the Comorian language was published in 1979 in two volumes by Mohamed Ahmed Chamanga and Noël Jacques Gueunier.

References

1856 births
1943 deaths
19th-century French Roman Catholic priests
Holy Ghost Fathers
French Roman Catholic missionaries
Linguists from France
French lexicographers
20th-century French botanists
Missionary botanists
Missionary linguists
19th-century French botanists